Festival Towers is a skyscraper of apartment buildings located in Brisbane, Australia. It is situated on the corner of Albert and Charlotte Streets. The tower has a modern green facade with a vivid architectural stance.

Festival Tower consists of 41 floors of 401 apartments ranging from one to three bedrooms. The tower also contains a podium level for residents and guests equipped with a pool, a spa, lawn and a dining area. The cost of construction was $162 million.

The tower is located on the site where Brisbane Festival Hall once stood, and the many images in the foyer pay homage to artists who played there.

In 2007, under the managements of the Oaks Group, the majority of rental leases were converted to short-term accommodation stays, effectively forcing out hundreds of residents and converting the building into a hotel. Subsequently, the building became a mix of owner-occupiers, corporate guests and permanent rentals.

See also
 
 List of skyscrapers in Brisbane

References

External links
 Festival Towers homepage
 Emporis.com page on Festival Towers
 SSL Brisbane Skyscraper Forum
 Festival Towers apartments
 SkyscraperPage

Skyscrapers in Brisbane
Residential buildings completed in 2006
Residential skyscrapers in Australia
Apartment buildings in Brisbane
Albert Street, Brisbane
Charlotte Street, Brisbane
Retail buildings in Queensland